The Life-Saving Plaque is an award given since 1983 by the Executive Board of the Czechoslovak Red Cross and later the Czech Red Cross.

Eligibility 
It is awarded to lay rescuers "for the expression of personal bravery and determination expressed in personal intervention leading to the provision of first aid to fellow citizens immediately endangered." Every citizen of the Czech Republic can be nominated for the award. The award is presented once a year at a ceremonial gathering in significant places in Prague.

Award criteria 

 the provision of first aid, which has been shown to save lives
 rescue of endangered persons, during which the life of the rescuer occurred or could have been endangered
 providing personal assistance in case of drowning, in case of risk of freezing
 in cases deserving special attention, which may be equivalent to life-saving measures

Holders

2021 
The award was not given.

2020 
The award was not given.

2019 (Žofín Palace) 

 Lukáš Kozel
 Metoděj Renza
 Ivan Valenta
 Jaromír Korčák and Štěpán Burgr
 Vít Penka and Matěj Šindelář

2018 (Wallenstein Palace – Main Hall) 

 Jiří Kopal

2017 (Wallenstein Palace – Main Hall) 

 Pavla Henzlová
 Jitka Křížová

2016 (Wallenstein Palace – Main Hall) 

 Karel Janderka

2015 (Wallenstein Palace – The Plenary Session Hall) 

 Matyáš Pocklan
 Lukáš Sagalinec

2014 (Wallenstein Palace – The Plenary Session Hall) 

 Ondřej Machoň

References 

Medal of Merit